Aaron White (born September 10, 1992) is an American professional basketball player for Darüşşafaka of the Turkish Basketbol Süper Ligi (BSL). He played college basketball for the University of Iowa.

College career
At the conclusion of his junior season, White was named to the Third Team All-Big Ten. He scored 26 points in Iowa's 83-52 win over Davidson in the Round of 64 of the 2015 NCAA Tournament. As a senior, he earned first-team All-Big Ten honors from the coaches and media.

Professional career
On June 25, 2015, White was selected with the 49th overall pick in the 2015 NBA draft by the Washington Wizards. He later joined the Wizards for the 2015 NBA Summer League where he averaged 3.0 points and 3.7 rebounds in six games. On July 26, 2015, he signed a one-year deal with Telekom Baskets Bonn of the Basketball Bundesliga. In June 2016, his contract expired and he left the team in pursuit of an NBA contract with the team that drafted him the year prior, the Washington Wizards. In five games played for the Wizards in the 2016 NBA Summer League, he averaged 7.2 points and 5.2 rebounds.

For the 2016–17 season, White signed with Zenit Saint Petersburg of the VTB United League and EuroCup.

On June 13, 2017, White signed with the Lithuanian team Žalgiris Kaunas. In his first season with the club, he averaged 8.9 points and 4.4 rebounds over 36 EuroLeague games. In 2018–19 season, White's production dropped slightly, as he averaged 8.2 points and 4.2 rebounds over 34 EuroLeague games.

On July 14, 2019, White signed a deal with the Italian team Olimpia Milano but transferred to Iberostar Tenerife in January. 

On August 6, 2020, White officially signed a one-year contract with Panathinaikos of the Greek Basket League and the EuroLeague.

On June 29, 2021, White signed a two-year contract with Crvena zvezda of the Basketball League of Serbia, the Adriatic League and the EuroLeague.

On September 13, 2022, White signed with Budućnost VOLI of the Adriatic League and Eurocup. On December 7, 2022, he left the club on a mutual agreement.

On December 25, 2022, White signed with Darüşşafaka of the Turkish Basketbol Süper Ligi (BSL).

NBA draft rights
On June 25, 2015, White was selected by the Washington Wizards with the 49th overall pick in the second round of the 2015 NBA draft. 
On July 6, 2019, his draft rights were traded to the Brooklyn Nets in a three-team trade.

Career statistics

College

|-
| style="text-align:left;"|2011–12
| style="text-align:left;"|Iowa
| 35 || 14 || 23.8 || .504 || .279 || .699 || 5.7 || 0.9 || 0.9 || 0.7 || 11.1
|-
| style="text-align:left;"|2012–13
| style="text-align:left;"|Iowa
| 38 || 38 || 29.2 || .468 || .227 || .748 || 6.2 || 1.3 || 1.1 || 0.7 || 12.8
|-
| style="text-align:left;"|2013–14
| style="text-align:left;"|Iowa
| 33 || 33 || 28.1 || .584 || .258 || .807 || 6.7 || 1.8 || 1.0 || 0.6 || 12.8
|-
| style="text-align:left;"|2014–15
| style="text-align:left;"|Iowa
| 34 || 34 || 31.5 || .521 || .356 || .819 || 7.3 || 1.4 || 1.3 || 0.5 || 16.4
|-
|- class="sortbottom"
| colspan="2" style="text-align:center;"|Career
| 140 || 119 || 28.1 || .517 || .281 || .773 || 6.4 || 1.4 || 1.1 || 0.6 || 13.3

European leagues

|-
| style="text-align:left;" | 2015–16 EuroCup
| style="text-align:left;" |  Telekom Baskets Bonn
| 10 || 6 || 25.1 || 55.8% || 25.0% || 82.9% || 6.3 || 0.7 || 0.6 || 0.2 || 12.3 || 14.5
|-
| style="text-align:left;" | 2016–17 EuroCup
| style="text-align:left;" |  Zenit St Petersburg
| 16 || 10 || 23.6 || 45.9% || 30.8% || 65.9% || 5.2 || 1.2 || 0.9 || 0.4 || 8.7 || 10.4
|-
| style="text-align:left;" | 2017–18 EuroLeague
| style="text-align:left;" |  Žalgiris Kaunas
| 36 || 2 || 22.4 || 53.8% || 38.5% || 74.7% || 4.4 || 1.0 || 0.6 || 0.4 || 8.9 || 10.2
|-
| style="text-align:left;"| 2018–19 EuroLeague
| style="text-align:left;" |  Žalgiris Kaunas
| 34 || 23 || 24.9 || 51.8% || 33.3% || 79.1% || 4.2 || 0.7 || 0.4 || 0.2 || 8.2 || 10.0
|-
| style="text-align:left;"| 2019–20 EuroLeague
| style="text-align:left;" |  AX Armani Exchange Milano
| 15 || 3 || 10.2 || 32.1% || 25.0% || 83.3% || 1.4 || 0.3 || 0.1 || 0.1 || 2.1 || 1.9
|-
| style="text-align:left;"| 2020–21 EuroLeague
| style="text-align:left;" |  Panathinaikos B.C.
| 33 || 17 || 22.4 || 50.0% || 36.5% || 80.6% || 4.0 || 1.0 || 0.5 || 0.2 || 7.3 || 9.0
|-
| style="text-align:left;"| 2021–22 EuroLeague
| style="text-align:left;" |  KK Crvena zvezda
| 18 || 9 || 18.1 || 37.3% || 29.7% || 83.9% || 3.6 || 1.2 || 0.6 || 0.1 || 5.5 || 7.4
|-
| style="text-align:left;" | 2022–23 EuroCup
| style="text-align:left;" |  KK Budućnost
| 6 || 0 || 14.7 || 45.4% || 22.2% || 82.4% || 3.7 || 1.2 || 0.5 || 0.3 || 7.7 || 9.7

Domestic leagues 

|-
| style="text-align:left;" | 2015-16
| style="text-align:left;" |  Telekom Baskets Bonn
| style="text-align:left;" | Basketball Bundesliga
| 34 || 27.4 || 53.1% || 36.2% || 75.0% || 5.7 || 1.2 || 0.8 || 0.3 || 13.4
|-
| style="text-align:left;" | 2016-17
| style="text-align:left;" |  Zenit Saint Petersburg
| style="text-align:left;" | VTB United League
| 30 || 24.1 || 44.5% || 37.6% || 65.6% || 6.6 || 1.3 || 0.8 || 0.4 || 9.3
|- style="background:#AFE6BA;"
| style="text-align:left;" | 2017-18
| style="text-align:left;" |  Žalgiris
| style="text-align:left;" | LKL
| 45 || 17.6 || 58.8% || 39.6% || 67.8% || 4.4 || 0.8 || 0.5 || 0.2 || 8.0
|- style="background:#AFE6BA;"
| style="text-align:left;" | 2018-19
| style="text-align:left;" |  Žalgiris
| style="text-align:left;" | LKL
| 40 || 19.4 || 54.0% || 43.9% || 77.6% || 4.2 || 1.0 || 0.7 || 0.2 || 8.6
|-
| style="text-align:left;" | 2019-20
| style="text-align:left;" |  AX Armani Exchange Milano
| style="text-align:left;" | Serie A
| 8 || 11.9 || 30.8% || 36.4% || 100% || 1.6 || 0.6 || 0.3 || 0.0 || 3.6
|-
| style="text-align:left;" | 2019-20
| style="text-align:left;" |  Iberostar Tenerife
| style="text-align:left;" | Liga ACB
| 8 || 22.1 || 50.0% || 36.8% || 81.8% || 4.1 || 0.6 || 0.5 || 0.1 || 7.3
|-
| style="text-align:left;" | 2020-21
| style="text-align:left;" |  Panathinaikos B.C.
| style="text-align:left;" | Greek Basket League
| 30 || 16.3 || 53.0% || 41.3% || 89.3% || 2.7 || 0.7 || 0.6 || 0.1 || 5.8
|-
| style="text-align:left;" | 2021-22
| style="text-align:left;" |  KK Crvena zvezda
| style="text-align:left;" | ABA League
| 21 || 16.7 || 44.9% || 29.1% || 78.3% || 3.1 || 1.5 || 0.5 || 0.2 || 7.1

References

External links
 Iowa Hawkeyes bio
 EuroLeague profile

1992 births
Living people
ABA League players
American expatriate basketball people in Germany
American expatriate basketball people in Greece
American expatriate basketball people in Italy
American expatriate basketball people in Lithuania
American expatriate basketball people in Montenegro
American expatriate basketball people in Russia
American expatriate basketball people in Serbia
American expatriate basketball people in Spain
American men's basketball players
Basketball League of Serbia players
Basketball players from Ohio
BC Žalgiris players
BC Zenit Saint Petersburg players
CB Canarias players
Darüşşafaka Basketbol players
Iowa Hawkeyes men's basketball players
KK Budućnost players
KK Crvena zvezda players
Lega Basket Serie A players
Liga ACB players
Olimpia Milano players
Panathinaikos B.C. players
People from Strongsville, Ohio
Power forwards (basketball)
Sportspeople from Cuyahoga County, Ohio
Telekom Baskets Bonn players
Washington Wizards draft picks